Brad Howard Greenberg (born February 24, 1954) is an American basketball coach.

Early life and college playing career
Greenberg was one of three sons of Marilyn and Ralph Greenberg of Plainview, New York, on Long Island. One of his brothers, Seth, would also grow up to be a college basketball coach. Brad Greenberg graduated from John F. Kennedy High School in 1972, then went to Washington State University as a freshman and played on the Washington State Cougars basketball team. He transferred to American University in Washington, D. C. and lettered in basketball from 1974 to 1977. Greenberg graduated from American University with a B.A. in interdisciplinary studies in athletics, media, and society.

Coaching career
Greenberg began his coaching career in 1977 as an assistant coach at his alma mater American University. From 1978 to 1984, he was an assistant coach at Saint Joseph's University under Jim Lynam. During Greenberg's time as assistant coach, Saint Joseph's appeared in the NIT in 1979, 1980, and 1984 and the NCAA tournament in 1981 and 1982, including a run to the Elite Eight in 1981. Saint Joseph's also was the 1979–80 regular season champion in the East Coast Conference (ECC) and won the 1981 and 1982 ECC tournaments.

In 1984, Greenberg followed Lynam to the NBA's Los Angeles Clippers, again as an assistant coach. Don Chaney replaced Lynam as head coach in the middle of the  season, and Greenberg remained on Chaney's staff until 1986. In the  season, Greenberg was an assistant coach for the New York Knicks under head coach Bob Hill.

Greenberg returned to coaching basketball in 2003 after nearly 15 years as an administrator. He joined the staff of head coach and younger brother Seth Greenberg at Virginia Tech. In 2004, Brad Greenberg was promoted to associate head coach. Virginia Tech made the 2005 NIT and 2007 NCAA tournament during Brad Greenberg's stint as assistant coach.

Greenberg was named head coach at Radford University in 2007. In four seasons at Radford, Greenberg had an overall 55–68 record: 10–20 in 2007–08, 21–12 in 2008–09 (including the Big South tournament championship and appearance in the NCAA tournament), 19–12 in 2009–10, and 5–23 in 2010–11.

He resigned his position at Radford University on May 18, 2011, amid NCAA investigations. In February 2012, Radford received two years of probation from the NCAA, but no postseason ban, for major recruiting violations. Greenberg was hit with a five-year show-cause penalty, which effectively barred him from college coaching during that period.

He coached the Bucaneros de La Guaira of the Venezuelan League, in 2011–12, and the team finished the regular season with a 20–16 record and a 3rd place regular season finish. The highest regular season finish in club history at that time.

He was formerly an assistant on former NBA head coach Eric Musselman's coaching staff for the senior Venezuela national basketball team that hosted FIBA's 2012 Men's Basketball Olympic Qualifying Tournament.

On July 7, 2017,  Greenberg was named Maccabi Ashdod head coach, signing a two-year deal. In his first season with Ashdod, he led them to the 2018 Israeli League Playoffs as the fourth seed, but they eventually were eliminated by Hapoel Tel Aviv.

On June 16, 2019, Greenberg signed a one-year contract extension with Ashdod. His contract was extended for the 2019/2020 season however the club was dragging down and when the Coronavirus struck, Greenberg left the team; which was demoted by the end of the season.

On July 22, 2019, Greenberg was named Canada national team assistant coach for the 2019 FIBA World Cup.

On August 5, 2020, he has signed with Ironi Nes Ziona of the Israeli Premier League. On April 25, 2021, he led Ness Ziona to a FIBA Europe Cup title.

On September 2, 2021 he signed with the Guaynabo Mets of the Baloncesto Superior Nacional of Puerto Rico league as Head Coach.

Scouting and administrative career
In 1989, he joined the Portland Trail Blazers front office as director of player personnel and remained in that position (renamed vice president of player personnel in 1992) until 1995.

In the  season, Greenberg was general manager and vice president of basketball operations for the Philadelphia 76ers. During his stint as general manager, the Philadelphia 76ers drafted scoring sensation Allen Iverson, dubbed by Philly fans as "The Answer," with 1996's first overall pick. In Iverson's third NBA season, the Sixers ended a string of seven consecutive losing seasons and simultaneously started a five-season NBA playoff run. However, Greenberg was fired after the 76ers finished the season 22–60.

Greenberg has also worked as a scout for various NBA teams and other agencies. In 2000, he was an executive at HoopsTV.com. From 2001 to 2003, Greenberg was director of basketball operations at the University of South Florida.

Head coaching record

College

Israeli Basketball Super League

|-
| style="text-align:left;"|Maccabi Haifa
|2012–13
| 27||17||10||.630|| style="text-align:center;"|2nd||9||7||2||.778
| style="text-align:center;"|Won BSL Final
|-
| style="text-align:left;"|Hapoel Jerusalem
|2013–14
| 28||21||7||.750|| style="text-align:center;"|2nd||8||4||4||.500
| style="text-align:center;"|Lost in Semi-Finals
|- class="sortbottom"
| colspan=2|Career
| 55||38||17||.690|| style="text-align:center;"|2nd||17||11||6||.647
| 
|-

References

Living people
1954 births
American basketball scouts
American Eagles men's basketball coaches
American Eagles men's basketball players
American expatriate basketball people in Israel
American expatriate basketball people in Turkey
American expatriate basketball people in Venezuela
American men's basketball coaches
American men's basketball players
Basketball coaches from New York (state)
Basketball players from New York (state)
College basketball controversies in the United States
College men's basketball head coaches in the United States
Hapoel Jerusalem B.C. coaches
Jewish American sportspeople
Jewish men's basketball players
Los Angeles Clippers assistant coaches
National Basketball Association controversies
National Basketball Association executives
NCAA sanctions
New York Knicks assistant coaches
People from Plainview, New York
Portland Trail Blazers executives
Radford Highlanders men's basketball coaches
Saint Joseph's Hawks men's basketball coaches
South Florida Bulls men's basketball coaches
Sportspeople from Nassau County, New York
Virginia Tech Hokies men's basketball coaches
Washington State Cougars men's basketball players